Lucie  is a 1963 Czechoslovak film directed by Karel Steklý. The film starred Josef Kemr.

Cast
 Josef Bek
 Karel Höger
 Václav Kankovský
 Waldemar Matuška
 Július Vasek

References

External links
 

1963 films
Czechoslovak drama films
1960s Czech-language films
Czech drama films
Films directed by Karel Steklý
1960s Czech films